David Ogden (born 30 March 1968) is a British wrestler. He competed in the men's freestyle 57 kg at the 1988 Summer Olympics.

References

1968 births
Living people
British male sport wrestlers
Olympic wrestlers of Great Britain
Wrestlers at the 1988 Summer Olympics
Place of birth missing (living people)